Ellisiv Andrea Steen (4 February 1908 – 27 October 2001) was a Norwegian professor and literary researcher.

Biography
She was born in Kristiania (now Oslo), Norway. She was the daughter of Harald Buch (1872–1950) and Camilla Collett (1878–1973) and  a sister of art historian Ada Polak. In 1933 she married professor and historian Sverre Steen. 

Her  master's thesis was a study of English writer and philosopher Aldous  Huxley. She gained her Doctor of Philosophy degree at the University of Oslo in 1948; the subject of her doctoral thesis was a treatment on the authorship of Norwegian writer Camilla Collett. She was a fellow of the Norwegian Academy of Science and Letters from 1955, and appointed professor at the University of Oslo in 1972.

She was a board member of Norsk Film from 1948 to 1964, and Norwegian editor of the Swedish periodical Ord och Bild from 1950 to 1959.

Selected works
Aldous Huxley  - 1935 
Diktning og virkelighet. En studie i Camilla Colletts forfatterskap  - 1947
Den lange strid. En studie i Camilla Colletts senere forfatterskap - 1954
Kristin Lavransdatter. En kritisk studie - 1959
Tarjei Vesaas: Is-slottet - 1964

References

1908 births
2001 deaths
University of Oslo alumni
Academic staff of the University of Oslo
Norwegian literary historians
Norwegian biographers
Norwegian magazine editors
Members of the Norwegian Academy of Science and Letters
20th-century biographers